Joondalup is an electoral district of the Legislative Assembly in the Australian state of Western Australia. The district is located in the northern suburbs of Perth.

Joondalup has tended to be a marginal seat, having been marginal from 1996 until 2021, when it became a safe seat for the first time since 1986.

Geography
The district lies in Perth's outer north, taking in areas west of Lake Joondalup. The seat includes the suburbs of Connolly, Edgewater, Joondalup, Heathridge, Ocean Reef, Iluka as well as part of the suburb of Currambine.

History
Joondalup was first created for the 1983 state election when it was won by Labor candidate Jackie Watkins, who held the seat for two terms. Joondalup was abolished and replaced by the new seat of Wanneroo ahead of the 1989 state election, at which point Watkins became the member for Wanneroo.

The seat was recreated for the 1996 state election when it was won by Liberal Party candidate Chris Baker. Baker was defeated after one term by Labor candidate Tony O'Gorman at the 2001 state election. O'Gorman held the seat until he was defeated at the 2013 state election by Liberal candidate Jan Norberger. Norberger was unable to overcome the Labor landslide at the 2017 state election and was defeated by Labor candidate Emily Hamilton after only one term.

The district boundaries were redistributed in 2019 which saw the suburbs of Beldon and Mullaloo removed from Joondalup electoral district and Iluka and part of Joondalup were added.

Members for Joondalup

Election results

References

External links
 ABC election profiles: 2005 2008 2013 2017
 WAEC district maps: current boundaries, previous distributions

Joondalup